Dora Bria (19 July 1958 – 22 January 2008) was a Brazilian six-time windsurfing champion.

Bria was known as a pioneer in Brazilian windsurfing. She won the national championship six times between 1990 and 1995. At the time of her death she held three South American championship titles.

Biography 
She was born in Rio de Janeiro to a Brazilian mother and Romanian father.

Death
On January 22, 2008, Bria crashed her pick-up truck, on a rainy Tuesday evening, in Minas Gerais (southeastern Brazil), on her way to her native Rio de Janeiro.

References

External links
 Dora Bria Online Tribute

1958 births
2008 deaths
Sportspeople from Rio de Janeiro (city)
Brazilian people of Romanian descent
Brazilian windsurfers
Road incident deaths in Brazil
Female windsurfers
20th-century Brazilian women